Stanley Gbagbeke (born 24 July 1989 in Oginibo, Delta State) is a Nigerian long jumper. He competed in the long jump event at the 2012 Summer Olympics.

Competition record

References

Sportspeople from Enugu
Nigerian male long jumpers
1989 births
Living people
Olympic athletes of Nigeria
Athletes (track and field) at the 2012 Summer Olympics
Athletes (track and field) at the 2010 Commonwealth Games
Competitors at the 2011 Summer Universiade
Commonwealth Games competitors for Nigeria